Tropical Cyclone Hyacinthe was the wettest tropical cyclone on record worldwide. The eighth named storm of the season, Hyacinthe formed on January 15, 1980, to the northeast of Mauritius in the southern Indian Ocean. Initially it moved to the west-southwest, and while slowly intensifying it passed north of the French overseas department of Réunion. On January 19, Météo-France estimated that the storm had intensified to a tropical cyclone. Hyacinthe looped to the south of eastern Madagascar and weakened, although it restrengthened after turning to the east. The storm executed another loop to the southwest of Réunion, passing near the island for a second and later third time. Hyacinthe became extratropical on January 29 after turning southward, dissipating two days later.

Over a 15-day period from January 14 to January 28,  of rainfall were recorded at Commerson Crater, a volcano caldera. The heaviest rainfall occurred through a process called orographic lift in the mountainous interior, leading to hundreds of landslides. Widespread floods damaged half the roads on Réunion and isolated three villages. Hyacinthe caused heavy damage to crops and damaged or destroyed 2,000 houses. Losses from the storm totaled $167 million (1980 USD, 676 million francs), and 25 people were killed.

Meteorological history

In the middle of January 1980, the Intertropical Convergence Zone persisted along 10° S, spawning a small low-level circulation near St. Brandon. It tracked to the west-southwest, passing north of the island on January 17. That day, the Joint Typhoon Warning Center (JTWC) also reported that a tropical depression had developed, giving it the identifier "08S". Shortly thereafter, the JTWC upgraded the depression to a tropical storm, and the MFR followed suit on January 18, naming the storm Hyacinthe. A strengthening anticyclone to the south turned the storm northwestward, and on January 20, Hyacinthe executed a small loop to the south, just offshore eastern Madagascar.

While moving to the south, Hyacinthe's winds steadily decreased, as the storm weakened. The next day, it turned to the east while slowly re-intensifying. During that time, Hyacinthe turned to the southeast and later weakened. The storm turned southward, becoming extratropical on January 29. Over the next two days, the remnants of Hyacinthe accelerated, turned to the east, and dissipated to the southeast of Madagascar.

Impact

For twelve days, the circulation of the storm produced cloudiness and thunderstorms over Réunion. Hyacinthe broke several rainfall records for tropical cyclones, becoming the wettest tropical cyclone on record. From January 14 to January 28, the storm dropped  at Commerson Crater, just north of the Piton de la Fournaise volcano. Over ten days, Hyacinthe produced , also at Commerson. In twelve hours, Hyacinthe dropped  of rainfall at Grand Îlet, just  shy of the record set by Cyclone Denise in 1966. The highest daily total was on January 25, when  fell at Commerson. Such heavy rainfall typically occurs on the island when tropical cyclones approach, owing to orographic enhancement in the mountainous interior.

Wave action was not severe due to the quick changes in track and lack of significant intensity. There was some beach erosion along western-facing beaches, and Pointe des Galets sustained damage to coastal properties. However, any major damage caused by the storm was largely due to the heavy rainfall. The Rivière Langevin reported increased flow, reaching a discharge of about 300 m3/s (10,500 ft3/s). Along Rivière-du-Mat les Bas, river flooding entered five houses. Along Route nationale 1, traffic was disrupted after rocks blocked the roadway. About half of the roads on Réunion were damaged, and road damage was estimated at $40 million (1980 USD, 161.3 million francs). The rain caused widespread mudslides, including hundreds near Salazie and Cilaos. Three towns were temporarily isolated, including Hell-Bourg which was cut off for about eight days, Helicopters delivered food and clothing to the villages.

Throughout Réunion, Hyacinthe killed 25 people and left 7,000 homeless. Four of the deaths occurred after a house was washed away at Petite-Île. A school was destroyed in Saint-Louis. The storm caused power and water outages, and about 30% of the island temporarily lost phone service. Hyacinthe damaged 1,712 houses and destroyed another 288; housing damage totaled about $42 million (1980 USD, 170 million francs). Flooding caused $48 million (1980 USD, 194 million francs) in agricultural damage, including about 1,000 killed cattle and near-total losses to bananas, mangoes, and avocados. Overall damage was estimated at $167 million (676 million francs). Many records set by the storm were broken by Cyclone Gamede in 2007, including the rainfall accumulations from three to eight days. However, Hyacinthe retained its status as the wettest overall tropical cyclone.

Elsewhere, Hyacinthe affected Madagascar as a weaker storm. At the same two locations, rainfall reached , respectively. On Mauritius, the storm's passage forced the main port to close.

See also

 List of wettest tropical cyclones by country
 Tropical cyclones in the Mascarene Islands
 Cyclone Dina (2002) – produced heavy rainfall on Renuion.

Notes

References

Hyacinthe
Tropical cyclones in the Mascarene Islands
Cyclones in Madagascar
South-West Indian Ocean tropical cyclones
Hyacinthe